Michael Lappin is an American retired ice hockey center who was an All-American for St. Lawrence.

Career
Lappin began attending Boston University in the fall of 1987, shortly after being drafted by his home-town Chicago Blackhawks. He played two good but unspectacular years for the Terriers, taking some time off during his sophomore season to play for Team USA at the World Junior Championships. After the season, Lappin decided to leave BU and transfer. Due to NCAA rules, because he was heading to another Division I program he would have to sit out a season. Fortunately, Lappin was still eligible to play junior hockey and was able to play for the Brockville Braves in 1990. He turned in a remarkable performance, scoring nearly three points per game and was named the league MVP.

When Lappin debuted for St. Lawrence the following year, it appeared that he had made the right decision. he more than doubled his previous career high and led the Saints with 69 points. For his senior season he was named an alternate captain and again led St. Lawrence in scoring. He helped the team win the ECAC Hockey Tournament that year and reach the NCAA Tournament.

After graduating, Lappin began his professional career in Finland but returned to North America after just 10 games. He played parts of two seasons with the Raleigh IceCaps, turning in great performances in the playoffs, before retiring in 1994.

Statistics

Regular season and playoffs

International

Awards and honors

References

External links

1969 births
Living people
Ice hockey people from Chicago
American men's ice hockey centers
Boston University Terriers men's ice hockey players
St. Lawrence Saints men's ice hockey players
AHCA Division I men's ice hockey All-Americans
Ilves players
Raleigh IceCaps players
Chicago Blackhawks draft picks